Semiarundinaria fastuosa, the Narihira bamboo, Narihira cane or Narihiradake, is a species of flowering plant in the grass family Poaceae, native to Japan.

In cultivation it is useful as an architectural plant or screen. It has gained the Royal Horticultural Society's Award of Garden Merit. 

The specific epithet fastuosa is Latin for "proud".

References

Bambusoideae
Endemic flora of Japan
Grasses of Asia